The 2019 World's Strongest Man was the 42nd edition of the World's Strongest Man competition. It took place in Bradenton, Florida between June 13 and 16. Martins Licis of the United States won the competition for the first time in his career. Mateusz Kieliszkowski of Poland finished second for the second year in a row. Defending champion Hafthor Julius Bjornsson of Iceland finished third, having suffered a torn plantar fascia during the qualifying heats that hampered him throughout the finals.

Heat Results

Format
There are five competitors per group. After four events, the competitor with the highest score qualifies for the final. The competitors in second and third place take part in the Last Man Standing event, which comprises lifting an Atlas Stone over a yoke.

Heat 1
 Events: Monster Truck Pull, Giants Medley, Car Deadlift for reps, Log Lift for reps.

Last Man Standing

Heat 2
 Events: Monster Truck Pull, Giants Medley, Car Deadlift for reps, Log Lift for reps.

Last Man Standing

Heat 3
 Events: Monster Truck Pull, Giants Medley, Car Deadlift for reps, Log Lift for reps.

 
Last Man Standing

Heat 4
 Events: Monster Truck Pull, Giants Medley, Car Deadlift for reps, Dumbbell Press for reps.

Last Man Standing

Heat 5
 Events: Monster Truck Pull, Giants Medley, Car Deadlift for reps, Dumbbell Press for reps.

Last Man Standing

Finals Events Results

Event 1: Loading Race
Weight: 1 x  barrel, 1 x  anvil and 2 x  sacks
Course Length: 
Time Limit: 75 seconds

Event 2: Overhead Press (Medley)
Weight:  double dumbbells,  circus dumbbell,  circus barbell and  log
Time Limit: 60 seconds
Notes: Athletes had a choice of order for the last two implements

Event 3: Squat Lift
Weight:  for repetitions
Time Limit: 75 seconds

Event 4: Deadlift (Hold)
Weight:  for as long as possible

Event 5: Atlas Stones
Weight: 5 stones ranging from 
Time Limit: 60 seconds
Total Weight:

Final standings

References

External links

 

World's Strongest Man
World's Strongest Man
World's Strongest Man